Nuvvu Vastavani is a 2000 Indian Telugu-language romance film,  directed by V. R. Prathap, written by Ezhil, and produced by R. B. Choudary. It stars Nagarjuna Akkineni and Simran in lead roles.The music of the movie was composed by S. A. Rajkumar. The film is a Telugu remake of the 1999 Tamil film Thulladha Manamum Thullum, in which Simran reprised her role.

Plot
The movie starts with Chinni (Nagarjuna) revealing, on a train journey from Pune to Hyderabad, that he just got out of jail after seven years. His past is revealed in a flashback. He had been a singer, waiting for the big break. Indu (Simran) hears his voice though she doesn't see him and becomes his fan. When Chinni realizes this, he tries to reveal who he is but circumstances place him and Indu in situations where she ends up thinking that he is rowdy. Chinni ultimately becomes responsible for her losing her eyesight too. He devotes himself to her from then onwards attending to her every need. She learns to respect and love him too, thinking that he is the singer and not knowing that he is the same person she thought was rowdy.

Chinni had been telling his mother everything by letter and when she dies, she donates her eyes to Indu. To come up with the money needed for the operation, Chinni donates his kidney and has to travel to Pune for the same. Ready to get back, he is arrested after agreeing to look after the luggage (which turns out to contain ammunition) of another man. Back in the present, everything has changed in the place he used to live. He catches a glimpse of Indu, now the collector. When he goes to meet her, she orders her officers to arrest him, remembering him as the rowdy who caused her eyesight loss. But when Chinni begins to sing, Indu realizes that the "rowdy" she arrested was none other than Chinni. She apologizes for misunderstanding him and they happily embrace, rekindling their relationship.

Cast

 Nagarjuna Akkineni as Chinni / Krishna
 Simran as Indira / Indu
 Kota Srinivasa Rao as Koteswara Rao
 Tanikella Bharani as Dr. Paramahamsa
 Brahmanandam as Nicker Narayana
 Ali as Madhava
 Sudhakar as Balu
 Mallikarjuna Rao as Nadar
 Surya as Krishna's friend
 Sivaji Raja as Dasu
 Varsha as Anitha
 Rama Prabha as Indu's grandmother
 Y. Vijaya as Koteswara Rao's wife
 Sudha as Indu's teacher
 Nutan Prasad
 Ponnambalam
 Prasad Babu
 Raghu Kunche
 Bandla Ganesh
 K. K. Sarma as Postman
 Madhu as Rowdy
 Garimalla Viswaswara Rao
 Gadiraju Subba Rao
 Ananth
 Naveen
 Raksha

Soundtrack

The music was composed by S. A. Rajkumar. Music released on ADITYA Music Company. Except "Komma Komma", all other tunes were used from the original Tamil film. Rajkumar reused "Komma Komma" in Tamil as "Unnai Kodu" in Unnai Kodu Ennai Tharuven (2000) and in Kannada as "Halli Hudugi" in Ramakrishna (2004). Meghamai song was reused from the song 'Sayonee' (1997).

References

External links
 

2000 films
2000s Telugu-language films
Indian romantic musical films
Telugu remakes of Tamil films
Films scored by S. A. Rajkumar
Super Good Films films